Hazardous Mutation is the second album by the American crossover thrash band Municipal Waste.  It is also the band's debut on Earache Records. The album's main theme is zombies, other monsters, and partying all tied together with humorous yet brutal lyrics. It was also released as a special edition with a bonus live DVD. It was the first album produced by Nick Poulos.

Background 
After the release of Waste 'em All, Municipal Waste, whose name comes from a garbage truck, were deemed a "Party Thrash" band. In the Hazardous Mutation Bonus DVD the members of the band were asked where that came from. Ryan Waste responded, "We just party, and we just thrash. Someone else put that together". The band was also asked about how they are reminiscent of the 80's thrash scene, and what they think they bring to the scene that's new. The band responded stating that the bring "life" back to the scene with this new style. They "take what bands were doing in six minute songs and cramming them into two".

Influences 
Each member of the band listed some of their influences on this album in the Hazardous Mutation Bonus DVD. In the interviews on the DVD Tony Foresta stated he was influenced by Caustic Christ, Baroness, D.R.I., and The Accüsed. Ryan Waste was influenced by many underground bands such as Razor, Hallows Eve, Menacer and Whiplash. Dave Witte was influenced by Slayer and ACDC. Land Phil's influences come mostly from death metal, i.e. Cannibal Corpse, Obituary, and Deicide. Overall influences shared by the band include Exodus, Vio-lence, Forbidden, and Annihilation Time.

Cover art 
The cover art was done by Ed Repka, who has done artwork for other metal bands such as Megadeth, Death, Massacre, Nuclear Assault, Merciless Death, etc. The cover is related to the song "Hazardous Mutation", in which people without chemical suits are turned into mutants. The surviving humans are being chased by a mob of mutants in a red dump-truck KamAz.

Track listing

Bonus live DVD 

"Intro"
"Deathripper"
"Drunk as Shit"
"Mind Eraser"
"Unleash the Bastards"
"The Thrashin' of the Christ"
"Sweet Attack"
"Mutants of War"
"Blood Drive"
"Accelerated Vision"
"New Song"
"Terror Shark"
"Toxic Revolution"
"Substitute Creature"
"Waste 'Em All"
"Bangover"

Live performances 
In the Hazardous Mutation Bonus DVD live performances are not only discussed, but they are seen. Municipal Waste uses insane gimmicks such as started the show with a Wizard who Raps, Putting their drummer, Dave Witte, in a shark costume, bringing a trampoline on stage for people to use for stage diving and bringing beach balls and boogey boards for crowd surfing. In the interview on the DVD when asked why people come to their shows they talk about all these insane gimmicks and how their fans actively participate by dressing up and running on stage having a good time. They also claim people come to their shows because they give away free beer.

Cultural reference 
The song "Guilty of Being Tight" opens with a quote from the horror movie Phantasm. Its name is an homage to the song "Guilty of Being White" by hardcore band Minor Threat.

Personnel 
Tony Foresta – lead vocals
Ryan Waste – guitars, backing vocals
Philip "Land Phil" Hall – bass, backing vocals
Dave Witte – drums

References 

Municipal Waste (band) albums
2005 albums
Albums with cover art by Ed Repka
Earache Records albums